In the run up to the April 2019 Spanish general election, various organisations carried out opinion polling to gauge voting intention in autonomous communities and constituencies in Spain during the term of the 12th Cortes Generales. Results of such polls are displayed in this article. The date range for these opinion polls is from the previous general election, held on 26 June 2016, to the day the next election was held, on 28 April 2019.

Voting intention estimates refer mainly to a hypothetical Congress of Deputies election. Polls are listed in reverse chronological order, showing the most recent first and using the dates when the survey fieldwork was done, as opposed to the date of publication. Where the fieldwork dates are unknown, the date of publication is given instead. The highest percentage figure in each polling survey is displayed with its background shaded in the leading party's colour. If a tie ensues, this is applied to the figures with the highest percentages. The "Lead" columns on the right shows the percentage-point difference between the parties with the highest percentages in a given poll.

Refusals are generally excluded from the party vote percentages, while question wording and the treatment of "don't know" responses and those not intending to vote may vary between polling organisations. When available, seat projections are displayed below the percentages in a smaller font.

Autonomous communities

Andalusia

Aragon

Asturias

Balearic Islands

Basque Country

Canary Islands

Cantabria

Castile and León

Castilla–La Mancha

Catalonia

Extremadura

Galicia

La Rioja

Madrid

Murcia

Navarre

Valencian Community

Constituencies

A Coruña

Álava

Albacete

Alicante

Almería

Ávila

Asturias

Badajoz

Balearic Islands

Barcelona

Biscay

Burgos

Cáceres

Cádiz

Cantabria

Castellón

Ceuta

Ciudad Real

Córdoba

Cuenca

Gipuzkoa

Girona

Granada

Guadalajara

Huelva

Huesca

Jaén

La Rioja

Las Palmas

León

Lleida

Lugo

Madrid

Málaga

Melilla

Murcia

Navarre

Ourense

Palencia

Pontevedra

Santa Cruz de Tenerife

Salamanca

Segovia

Seville

Soria

Tarragona

Teruel

Toledo

Valencia

Valladolid

Zamora

Zaragoza

See also
Opinion polling for the April 2019 Spanish general election

Notes

References